The AT&T Canada Senior Open Championship was a professional golf tournament in Canada on the Senior PGA Tour, now the PGA Tour Champions. Held from 1981 to 1985 and 1996 to 2002, it was played at a different course each year.

The purse for the 2002 edition was US$1.6 million, with a winner's share of $240,000; it was founded in 1981 as the Peter Jackson Champions.

Winners
2002 Tom Jenkins (2)
2001 Walter Hall
2001 Tom Jenkins
1999 Jim Ahern
1998 Brian Barnes

du Maurier Champions
1997 Jack Kiefer
1996 Charles Coody
1986–1995 No tournament
1985 Peter Thomson
1984 Don January (2)

Peter Jackson Champions
1983 Don January
1982 Bob Goalby
1981 Miller Barber

Source:

References

Former PGA Tour Champions events
Golf tournaments in Canada
Recurring sporting events established in 1981
Recurring sporting events disestablished in 2002
1981 establishments in Canada
2002 disestablishments in Canada